Lorie is a feminine name. It may refer to:

People
Given name
Lorie (singer) (full name Laure Pester) (born 1982), French singer
Lorie Conway, American independent producer and filmmaker
Lorie Griffin, American film and television actress
Lorie Kane (born 1964), Canadian professional golfer
Lorie Line (born 1958), American New Age pianist, composer, and performer
Lorie O'Clare, American author of erotic romance, romantic suspense and paranormal romance novels
Lorie Skjerven Gildea (born 1961), American attorney and Chief Justice
Lorie Tarshis (1911–1993), Canadian economist

Middle name
Jill Lorie Hurst, American television soap opera writer and producer

Film and television
Lorie (film), a 1984 Indian film directed by Vijay Talwar, starring Shabana Azmi and Farooq Shaikh
Lorie Brooks, a fictional character in The Young and the Restless

Other uses
Lories and lorikeets, arboreal parrots indigenous to Australasia